County Longford was a parliamentary constituency in Ireland, which returned two Members of Parliament (MPs) to the House of Commons of the Parliament of the United Kingdom from 1801 to 1885, and one MP from 1918 to 1922.

Boundaries
This constituency comprised the whole of County Longford.

Members of Parliament

MPs 1801–1885

MPs 1918–1922

Elections

Elections in the 1800s

{{Election box winning candidate with party link|
 |party = Whigs (British political party)
 |candidate = Viscount George Forbes
 |votes = Unopposed
 |percentage = N/A
 |change = N/A'
}}

Elections in the 1810s

Sir Thomas Fetherston died, causing a by-election.

Elections in the 1820s

Elections in the 1830s

 
 

 
 

On petition, a House of Commons Select Committee inquiry disqualified 73 votes and declared Forbes and Lefroy the winners of the election.

 
 

Viscount Forbes died, causing a by-election.

On petition, a House of Commons committee inquiry disqualified 94 votes and declared Fox the winner of the election by a majority of 1.

 
 

Elections in the 1840s

 

On petition, a House of Commons committee began an inquiry into the votes cast for Luke White, but he withdrew his candidacy after 1 vote was examined and Lefroy was declared elected on 18 April 1842
.

 
 

Elections in the 1850s
Blackall was appointed Lieutenant-Governor of Dominica, causing a by-election.

 

Fox's death caused a by-election.

 
 

 

Elections in the 1860s
White's resignation caused a by-election.

White was appointed a Lord Commissioner of the Treasury, requiring a by-election.

Greville-Nugent was created Lord Greville, causing a by-election.

Elections in the 1870s
On petition, Greville-Nugent was unseated.

 

O'Reilly was appointed Assistant Commissioner of Intermediate Education and resigned, causing a by-election.

Elections in the 1880s

 Elections in the 1910s 

Notes

ReferencesThe Parliaments of England'' by Henry Stooks Smith (1st edition published in three volumes 1844–50), 2nd edition edited (in one volume) by F.W.S. Craig (Political Reference Publications 1973)

Westminster constituencies in County Longford (historic)
Dáil constituencies in the Republic of Ireland (historic)
Constituencies of the Parliament of the United Kingdom established in 1801
Constituencies of the Parliament of the United Kingdom disestablished in 1885
Constituencies of the Parliament of the United Kingdom established in 1918
Constituencies of the Parliament of the United Kingdom disestablished in 1922